, better known as , is a Japanese actor and musician who is represented by the talent agency, Village, and belongs to Gekidan Shin Kan-sen. He is the bassist of the visual kei rock band, Ninjaman Japan, and is nicknamed Metal.

Yoshida graduated from Kanazawa Nishioka High School and Higashiho Gakuen College. His wife is actress Hiromi Iwasaki.

Biography
In 1992, Yoshida joined to Gekidan Shin Kan-sen and his acting debut was in the stage play, Gorō ni Omakase. In addition, his performances were guest conductors in various works and activities in stage musicals. In 2013, Yoshida also deals with the production for the Gekidan Brats' performance, Red Kill: Makkanauso no Kakikata.

In 2009, together with Psycho le Cému, they formed the visual kei rock band, Ninjaman Japan, which started his music career as the bassist nicknamed Metal.

In 2013, Yoshida appeared in the TV Asahi series, Kamen Rider Gaim, as the character Oren Pierre Alfonso / Kamen Rider Bravo.

In his private life, he married actress Hiromi Iwasaki on April 15, 2007. They reportedly dated on 2006 in the musical, Peter Pan. They later have two daughters.

Filmography

TV series

Films

References

External links
 Official profile 
  

Japanese male actors
Visual kei musicians
1971 births
Living people
Musicians from Ishikawa Prefecture